Cuellar or Cuéllar is a Spanish surname derived from Cuéllar, a town in the Segovia province of Spain. The name has a number of variations, including "Cuéllar", "de Cuéllar", "Cuellar", "de Cuellar", "Cuello", "de Cuello", "Coello", and "de Coello". The surname first emerged in the Kingdom of Castile during the Middle Ages.

Origin and history

The color of the Cuéllar coat of arms is Azur; corresponding to the symbol of water and the continuity of life, Azur is a color that signifies nobility, beauty, chastity, and fidelity, as well as other virtues that characterised the family, such as economic abundance, perseverance, luck, fame and the desire to win.

Notable persons

Artists and academics
José Cuéllar, Anthropologist and musician
Juan de Cuéllar, Spanish pharmacologist
Nicolás Cuéllar (1927–2010), Mexican painter
José Tomás de Cuéllar (1830–1894), poet, playwright, and novelist
Ronnie Scon Johnson Cuéllar(1976)Historian and Philanthropist

Politicians and officials
Angelica Guerrero-Cuellar, American politician
Francisco de Cuellar, Spanish sea captain
Henry Cuellar, member of the United States House of Representatives
Javier Pérez de Cuéllar (1920–2020), Peruvian diplomat
Juana Rangel de Cuéllar, Spanish conquistador
Luis Francisco Cuéllar (1940–2009), Colombian politician
Renato Cuellar, member of the Texas House of Representatives
Savina Cuéllar, Bolivian politician

Sports players and coaches
Ángel Cuéllar, Spanish former footballer
Bobby Cuellar, American pitching coach
Carlos Cuéllar, Spanish footballer
David Cuéllar, Spanish footballer
Diego Cuéllar, Salvadoran footballer
Fabián Cuéllar, Colombian footballer
Fernando Cuellar, Peruvian footballer
Gustavo Cuéllar, Colombian footballer
Hugo Alcaraz-Cuellar, Mexican footballer
Iván Cuéllar, Spanish footballer
Jesus Cuellar, Argentine boxer
Leonardo Cuéllar, Mexican former footballer
Miguel Ángel Cuéllar, Paraguayan footballer
Miguel Cuéllar, Colombian chess master
Mike Cuellar (1937–2010), Cuban baseball player
Pablo Cuéllar, Panamanian chess master
Renae Cuéllar, Mexican–American footballer
Jaume Cuéllar, Spanish footballer

Gallery

References

Spanish-language surnames
Spanish families